Future Porn Machine is the second official album of Serbian industrial group dreDDup. It was first released in 2007 for the Belgrade record label Insurrection Records. The album is a concept album which presents a vision of a far-flung future where culture has deteriorated to the point where only pornography and machine-made men remain. The album artwork represents the Greek goddess Nike, who represents power and victory. Guest musicians on this release were: DJ Shark Zowie, Merimah, Nikola Vetnic, Khargash and Aleksandar Krajovan.

Works 1996–2007, a compilation album consisting of rare and unreleased dreDDup tracks was released as a promotion for Future Porn Machine. Future Porn Machine was later remastered and re-released in 2008.

Track listing
 Going Away – 5:36
 Not From Here – 4:25
 Never Tell – 3:22
 W R – 4:13
 FuckFest – 3:53
 No More Fingers – 3:51
 N.O.A. (f Shark) – 3:20
 Generation Devsatation (metallic mix) – 2:14
 One – 3:13
 Reedemer – 3:14
 When You Know That It's All Wrong – 4:32
 Defiant – 3:13
 Bayonet – 3:48
 If There Is... – 4:53
 Jinkeez – 3:49
 Inside Out – 3:54
 The Secret Song – 4:04
 Jungle Grey (f Shark) – 4:57

Personnel
 Mihajlo Obrenov; miKKa – lead vocals, electronics, rhythm guitar
 Srdjan Stevanovic – drums
 Darko Izak – lead guitar
 Nemanja Batalo – bass, backing vocals
 Nikola Vetnic – violoncello
 Aleksandar Krajovan – bass
 Jovan Matic – back vocals

Production
 Nikola Pavlicevic – producers
 miKKa; miKKa – engineer
 miKKa; miKKa – remastering

Sources
 http://www.discogs.com/dreDDup-Future-Porn-Machine/release/1568727
 http://www.side-line.com/rss_reviews.php?id=P31388
 https://web.archive.org/web/20080618184239/http://www.fabryka.darknation.eu/php-files_en/readarticle.php?article_id=222
 https://web.archive.org/web/20080618165831/http://caozdravo.com/cms/content/view/62/49/

References
Ristić, M (2009). Domaća izdanja, Nocturne Magazine

2007 albums
DreDDup albums